Miss Algeria is a national beauty pageant in Algeria.

History and awards
Since its official creation on 24 November 1996 with a deposit of copyright at the ONDA, the contest organized by Abdelkader Hamdad Cherradi was taken over in 2013 by his son Faisal Hamdad. Winners of the pageant are:
1999: Dounia Amesrar, Annaba Province
2000: Soraya Boukebir, Aïn Defla Province
2001: Competition canceled due to the disaster which hit the region of Ain-Témouchent
2002: Lamia Saoudi, First Algerian to participate in the Miss World contest, it is ranked 26th in the 2002 edition
2003: Competition canceled (in solidarity with the victims of the earthquake of Boumerdes)
2004: Carmen Mehdaoui, Boumerdès Province
2005: Nesrine Melbani, Algiers Province
2013: Rym Amari, Algiers Province which won the title of Best Model of Africa 2013

Conditions
To compete for Miss Algeria, applicants are to fulfill the following conditions:
 Are born female and of Algerian nationality
 Are between 18 and 27 years of age from the date of the preselection
 Are childless and not married.
 Do not have a criminal record.

Titleholders

Algeria at International pageants

Miss Universe Algeria

Miss World Algeria

Miss Earth Algeria

Miss Grand Algeria

The Miss Globe Algeria

Miss Eco Algeria

Face of Beauty Algeria

Top Model Algeria

Notes
Sarah Boutiche was the first Algerian delegate at the Miss World pageant. She went on to compete in Alexandra Palace in London, United Kingdom and is unplaced.

References

Beauty pageants in Algeria
2013 establishments in Algeria
Competitions in Algeria
Recurring events established in 1999
Algeria
Algerian awards